Richard 'Rick' Knabb is an American meteorologist who served as the 11th Director of the National Hurricane Center from June 4, 2012 to May 12, 2017. On March 21, 2017, Knabb announced his return to The Weather Channel as the tropical weather expert which was the position he held from 2010 to 2012. As a result, he left the position of Director of the NHC.

Early life and education
Knabb was born in Chicago, Illinois and was raised in suburban Fort Lauderdale, Florida and in the Houston, Texas suburb of Katy. He attended Purdue University earned a bachelor's degree in Atmospheric Science before earning a master's degree and Ph.D. in meteorology from Florida State University.

Meteorology career
Knabb started working for the NHC in 2001. He served as a Senior Hurricane Specialist from 2005 to 2008. He left the NHC to become deputy director of the Central Pacific Hurricane Center in Hawaii where he stayed until joining The Weather Channel in May 2010 replacing Steve Lyons as tropical weather expert.
He was announced as Director of the National Hurricane Center starting June 4, 2012 replacing Bill Read. He is back at The Weather Channel as of 2017.

References

American meteorologists
Living people
National Weather Service people
National Oceanic and Atmospheric Administration personnel
Florida State University alumni
The Weather Channel people
Year of birth missing (living people)